Several ships have been named Comodoro Rivadavia:

  – Argentine-flag passenger-cargo liner owned by German company Hamburg Süd and built in 1890 by Reiherstieg Schiffswerfte & Maschinenfabrik, Hamburg as Paraguassu.  She was stranded in Argentina in 1903.
  – built by Workman, Clark and Company, Belfast in 1905 as Booth Line's passenger-cargo liner Anselm and purchased by Argentina Compañía General de Navegación SA in 1922. She later suffered boiler explosion as Rio Santa Cruz.
 , a survey vessel commissioned in 1928 as San Juan she was  renamed Comodoro Riavdavia in 1937 and Madryn in 1942. She was sold in 1967.
  – an oil tanker built by P. Smit Jr at Rotterdam for Yacimientos Petroliferos Fiscales, Buenos Aires. Broken up in 1981.
 , a survey ship commissioned in the Argentine Navy in 1974.

See also
 List of ships named ARA Rivadavia

Ship names